Henry Ley (1887–1962) was an English organist, composer and music teacher. 

Henry Ley may also refer to:

Henry Ley, 2nd Earl of Marlborough (1595–1638), English peer and Member of Parliament
Henry Ley of the Ley baronets

See also
Henry Lee (disambiguation)